The 1911–12 season was the third year of football played by Dundee Hibernian, and covers the period from 1 July 1911 to 30 June 1912.

Match results
Dundee Hibernian played a total of 22 matches during the 1911–12 season.

Legend

All results are written with Dundee Hibernian's score first.
Own goals in italics

Second Division

References

Dundee United F.C. seasons
Dundee Hibernian